Sonam Wangchuk (born 1 September 1966) is an Indian engineer, innovator and education reformist. He is the founding-director of the Students' Educational and Cultural Movement of Ladakh (SECMOL), which was founded in 1988 by a group of students who had been in his own words, the 'victims' of an alien education system foisted on Ladakh. He is also known for designing the SECMOL campus that runs on solar energy and uses no fossil fuels for cooking, lighting or heating.

Wangchuk was instrumental in the launch of Operation New Hope in 1994, a collaboration of government, village communities and the civil society to bring reforms in the government school system. He invented the Ice Stupa technique that creates artificial glaciers, used for storing winter water in the form of a cone-shaped ice heap.

Early life 
Wangchuk was born in 1966 in Uleytokpo, near Alchi in the Leh district of Ladakh. He was not enrolled in a school until the age of 9, as there were not any schools in his village. His mother taught him all the basics in his own mother tongue until that age. His father Sonam Wangyal, a politician who later became the minister in state government, was stationed in Srinagar. At the age of 9, he was taken to Srinagar and enrolled in a school there. Since he looked different compared to the other students, he would get addressed in a language that he did not understand, due to which his lack of responsiveness was mistaken for him being stupid. He recalls this period as the darkest part of his life. Unable to bear the treatment, in 1977 he escaped alone to Delhi where he pleaded his case to the school principal at Vishesh Kendriya Vidyalaya.

Wangchuk completed his B.Tech. in Mechanical Engineering from National Institute of Technology Srinagar (then REC Srinagar) in 1987. Due to differences with his father over the choice of engineering stream, he had to finance his own education. He also went for two years of higher studies in Earthen Architecture at Craterre School of Architecture in Grenoble, France, in 2011.

Career 
In 1988, after his graduation, Wangchuk (with his brother and five peers) started Students' Educational and Cultural Movement of Ladakh (SECMOL). After experimenting with school reforms in government high school at Saspol, SECMOL launched Operation New Hope in collaboration with the government education department and the
village population.

From June 1993 until August 2005, Wangchuk also founded and worked as the editor of Ladakh's only print magazine Ladags Melong In 2001, he was appointed to be an advisor for the education in the Hill Council Government. In 2002, together with other NGO heads, he founded Ladakh Voluntary Network (LVN), a network of Ladakhi NGOs, and served in its executive committee as the secretary till 2005. He was appointed to the Drafting Committee of the Ladakh Hill Council Government’s Vision Document Ladakh 2025 and entrusted with the formulation of the policy on Education and Tourism in 2004. The document was formally launched by Dr. Manmohan Singh, the Prime Minister of India in 2005. In 2005, Wangchuk was appointed as a member in the National Governing Council for Elementary Education in the Ministry of Human Resource Development, Government of India.

From 2007 to 2010, Wangchuk worked as an education advisor for MS, a Danish NGO working to support the Ministry of Education for education reforms.

In late 2013, Wangchuk invented and built a prototype of the Ice Stupa which is an artificial glacier that stores the wasting stream waters during the winters in the form of giant ice cones or stupas, and releases the water during late spring as they start melting, which is the perfect time when the farmers need water. He was appointed to the Jammu and Kashmir State Board of School Education in 2013. In 2014, he was appointed to the Expert panel for framing the J&K State Education Policy and Vision Document. Since 2015, Sonam has started working on establishing Himalayan Institute of Alternatives. He is concerned about how most of the Universities, especially those in the mountains have become irrelevant to realities of life.

In 2016, Wangchuk initiated a project called FarmStays Ladakh, which provides tourists to stay with local families of Ladakh, run by mothers and middle-aged women. The project was officially inaugurated by Chetsang Rinpoche on 18 June 2016.

Innovations 
Wangchuk has been helping in designing and overseeing the construction of several passive solar mud buildings in mountain regions like Ladakh, Nepal, Sikkim so that energy savings principles are implemented on a larger scale. Even in -30 Celsius winters, his solar-powered school, built with the rammed earth, keeps the students warm.

Led by Wangchuk, SECMOL has won the International Terra Award for the best building in July 2016 at the 12th World Congress on Earthen Architecture in Lyon, France. The rammed earth 'Big Building', located at SECMOL. The campus was built using simple, low-cost traditional techniques on principles of passive solar architecture. The building comprises a big solar-heated teaching hall, along with several rooms for the students and other classrooms.

Ice Stupa 

In January 2014, Wangchuk started a project called the Ice Stupa. His aim was to find a solution to the water crisis being faced by the farmers of Ladakh in the critical planting months of April and May before the natural glacial melt waters start flowing. By the end of February in 2014, they had successfully built a two-storey prototype of an ice stupa which could store roughly 150,000 litres of winter stream water which nobody wanted at the time.

In 2015, when Ladakh faced a crisis due to a landslide which blocked the Phugtal river in Zanskar and caused formation of 15 km long lake which became a huge threat for the downstream population, Wangchuk proposed to use a siphon technique to drain the lake and water jet erosion to safely cut the edges instead of blasting the lake as was being planned. However, his advice was ignored and blasting work was carried on. On 7 May 2015, the lake finally burst into flash flood which destroyed 12 bridges and many fields.

In 2016, Wangchuk started applying the Ice Stupa technique for disaster mitigation at high altitude glacier lakes. He was invited by the Government of Sikkim to apply siphon technique for another dangerous lake in their state. In September 2016, he led a three-week expedition to the South Lhonak Lake in North-West Sikkim, which had been declared dangerous for the last few years. His team camped for two weeks at the lake, amidst rain and snow, installing the first phase of a siphoning system to drain the lake to a safer level until other measures were taken up.

In late 2016, the idea started gaining traction from the authorities in the Swiss Alps. Wangchuk was invited by the president of Pontresina, a municipality in the Engadine valley, Switzerland to build Ice Stupas to add to their winter tourism attractions. In October 2016, Wangchuk and his team went to the Swiss Alps and started building the first Ice Stupa of Europe, together with the Swiss partners.

In February 2018, a group of young local sculptors and artists from Ladakh built an actual 10-feet high ice stupa. The wondrous sculpture is made entirely of ice and it took them 25 days of hard work and dedication to complete the project. What makes it more special and challenging for the team was the extreme conditions under which they've worked. As the stupa was housed inside another giant ice tower (ice stupa artificial glacier), they have to work in very low temperature of at least -12 degrees Celsius.

Politics 
In 2013, on repeated requests from students community of Ladakh, Wangchuk helped launch the New Ladakh Movement (NLM), a social campaign and Ladakh's version of Green Party with the aim of working for sustainable education, environment and economy. It also aimed at uniting all local political leaders under one banner for the growth and development of Ladakh. Eventually, the members decided to make it into a non-political social movement.

Boycott of Chinese products 
In June 2020, in response to the India-China border skirmishes, Sonam Wangchuk appealed to Indians to use "wallet power" and boycott Chinese products. This appeal was covered by major media houses and supported by various celebrities. Following the Galwan Valley clash on 15 June 2020, there were calls across India to boycott Chinese goods.

Ladakh autonomy protest 
On 26 January 2023, to highlight the effects of climate change on the fragile ecosystem of Ladakh and to demand its protection under the Sixth Schedule of the Indian Constitution, Wangchuk attempted to go on a fast at the Khardungla pass. However, the authorities prevented him from going to Khardungla by putting him under house arrest, restricting his movement, as well as restricting people from visiting him. The police denied the charges, stating that he had not been given permission to enter Khardung La pass, citing temperatures being unsuitable for the fast, at less than -40°C. They also detained a few of his students supporting him from the HIAL campus. Wangchuk continued to voice his protest and fasting from the HIAL campus.

In popular culture 
Wangchuk came into the spotlight in 2009, when his story inspired Aamir Khan's character Phunsukh Wangdu in the film 3 Idiots directed by Rajkumar Hirani. He has been referred as "The real life Phunsukh Wangdu". However he says that he is not Phunsukh Wangdu.

Awards

References

External links
 Official website
Sonam Wangchuk is saving the world one ice stupa at a time, at GQ (Indian edition)
Sonam Wangchuk's Interview at News Nation
Education in India: Are students failing or the system? at TED talk

1966 births
Living people
20th-century Indian inventors
20th-century Indian engineers
21st-century Indian inventors
Indian environmentalists
Indian social entrepreneurs
Ladakhi people
National Institutes of Technology alumni
National Institute of Technology, Srinagar alumni
People from Ladakh
Ramon Magsaysay Award winners
Science and technology in Ladakh